WKIQ (1240 AM) is a 790-watt radio station. Licensed to Eustis, Florida, United States, it serves the Orlando area. The station is owned by Shanti Persaud, through licensee Unity Broadcasting LLC, and is running a Música Cristiana format.

History
Until December 2010 the station carried Yahoo! Sports Radio (formerly Sporting News Radio) and had a local program called The Winning Drive which ran Monday to Friday from 4-6 pm.

Between 1995 and 1998, WKIQ aired a mixture of local and syndicated talk programming, before a switch to satellite-fed Classic Country music took place in March 1998, just prior to the station being sold.  News was provided by NBC News at top of every hour during this period, with Florida's FRN News on the half hour.

Due to co-ownership by Gateway Broadcasting and Internet, the radio stations of WKIQ and WQBQ were sister stations for a period of time between 1998 and 2003.

WKIQ was silent for much time between 2003 and 2005, as the previous owner had declared bankruptcy and shuttered the WKIQ and WQBQ stations.

According to FCC filings in October 2017, the station tower collapsed during Hurricane Irma in September 2017 and the station resumed broadcasting in October 2017.

As of 2018, WKIQ 1240 AM broadcasts a Regional Mexican format under the name "La Nueva Que Buena", which was previously on WLAA 1600 AM.

References

External links
La Gigante WKIQ Facebook

KIQ